The list of gardens is a link page for any park or garden open to the public, anywhere in the world.

Argentina
Buenos Aires Botanical Garden

Australia

Australian Capital Territory
Australian National Botanic Gardens

New South Wales
Auburn Botanical Gardens
Royal Botanic Gardens
Wollongong Botanic Garden

Queensland
 Anderson Park, Townsville
Brisbane Botanic Gardens, Mount Coot-tha
City Botanic Gardens
The Palmetum, Townsville
Queens Gardens, Townsville
Roma Street Parkland

Victoria
Melbourne parks and gardens 
Geelong Botanic Gardens

Austria
Schönbrunn Palace Gardens
Belvedere Gardens

Brazil
Flamengo Park
Rio de Janeiro Botanical Garden
Inhotim
Botanical Garden of São Paulo
Sítio Roberto Burle Marx
Botanical Garden of Curitiba
Porto Alegre Botanical Garden
Jardim Botânico de Belo Horizonte 
Jardim Botânico de Brasília

Canada

Butchart Gardens, Greater Victoria, British Columbia
Royal Botanical Gardens, Hamilton, Ontario
Stanley Park, Vancouver, British Columbia

China

Colombia
Bogotá Botanical Garden, Bogotá
Botanical Garden of Medellín, Medellín
Nutibara sculpture park

Czech Republic
Mulberry Garden
Vrtba Garden

Denmark
Kongens Have (King's Garden), Copenhagen

Egypt

Montaza Palace Gardens

France

Gardens of Versailles
Potager du roi, Versailles
Roseraie du Val-de-Marne
Parc de la Tête d'or

Germany

Dessau-Wörlitz Garden Realm
Englischer Garten

Greece
National Garden, Athens

Hong Kong

Iceland
Akureyri Botanical Garden, Akureyri

Iran

Afif-Abad Garden, Shiraz
Chehel Sotun Garden, Behshahr, Iran
Chehel Sotun Garden, Isfahan
Cheshmeh Garden, Behshahr
Delgosha Garden, Shiraz
Dowlatabad Garden, Yazd
Eram Garden, Shiraz
Farahabad Garden, Mazandaran
Fin Garden, Kashan
Ghavam Garden, Shiraz
Golestan Garden, Tabriz
Golshan Garden, Tabas
Hasht Behesht, Isfahan
Jahan Nama Garden, Shiraz
Mosalla Garden, Nain, Iran
Narenjestan Garden, Shiraz
Nazar Garden, Shiraz
Qadamgah Garden, Nishapur
Shah Goli, Tabriz
Shahzadeh Garden, Kerman

Italy

Biennale Gardens, Venice
Bioparco, Rome
Boboli Gardens, Florence
Bomarzo Garden (Park of the Monsters), Bomarzo
Caserta Palace Garden, Caserta
Castello Sforzesco Garden (Parco Sempione), Milan
Domus Aurea, Rome
Ducal Palace of Colorno, Colorno
Ducal Palace of Sassuolo, Sassuolo
La Foce, Montepulciano
Fonte di Fata Morgana, Grassina
The garden of the Rotonda Padua, Padua
Gardens of Sallust, Rome
Gardens of Trauttmansdorff Castle, Meran
Giardini di Giusti, Verona
Isola Madre, Alpine Lake Maggiore
Palatine Hill, Rome
Palazzo Malipiero Garden, Venice
Palazzo Pfanner Garden, Lucca
Palazzo Piccolomini Garden, Pienza
Parco Virgiliano, Naples
Villa Ada, Rome
Villa Adriana, Tivoli
Villa Aldobrandini, Frascati
Villa Barbarigo a Valsanzibio, Padua
Villa Borghese gardens, Rome
Villa Carlotta, Como
Villa Cetinale, Sovicille
Villa Comunale (originally Royal Garden), Naples
Villa del Balbianello, Como
Villa d'Este, Tivoli
Villa Doria Pamphili, Rome
Villa Durazzo-Pallavicini, Genoa
Villa La Petraia, Florence
Villa La Pietra, Florence
Villa Lante, Viterbo
Villa Marlia Garden, Lucca
Villa Medici, Rome
Villa Medici at Cafaggiolo, Barberino di Mugello
Villa Palmieri, Fiesole, Fiesole
Villa San Michele, Naples
Vittoriale degli Italiani, Brescia

Japan

Banshu Yamasaki Iris Garden
Isui-en
Kairaku-en
Kanehiranari-en
Koko-en
Kōraku-en
Kōsetsu-en
Oyaku-en
Rakusui-en
Ran no Yakata
Ritsurin Garden
Saitō Garden
Sankei-en
Seibi-en
Seito shoin teien
Sengan-en
Shikina-en
Shinjuku Gyo-en
Shofu-en
Shōyō-en
Shukkei-en
Shūraku-en
Suizen-ji Jōju-en
Three Great Gardens of Japan
Tokugawa Garden
Yoshiki-en 
Zuiraku-en

Latvia
Vērmane Garden

Malaysia

Bukit Nanas
Kuala Lumpur Butterfly Park
KLCC Park
National Botanical Garden Shah Alam
Penang Botanic Gardens
Perdana Botanical Gardens
Perdana Park
Taiping Lake Gardens
Titiwangsa Lake Gardens

Malta

Mexico
Alameda Central
Garden of the Triple Alliance
Texcotzingo
Xochitla

Monaco
Casino Gardens and Terraces
Fontvieille Park and Princess Grace Rose Garden
Japanese Garden, Monaco
St Martin Gardens

Morocco
Agdal Gardens
Majorelle Garden
Menara gardens

Netherlands
Keukenhof
Prinsentuin
Thijsse's Hof

New Zealand
Ayrlies Garden
Eden Garden
Glenfalloch Gardens
Government Gardens
Hamilton Gardens
Moturau Moana
Ohinetahi
Parnell Rose Gardens
Pukeiti
Tūpare

Norway
Flor og Fjære

Oman
Naseem Garden
Oman Botanic Garden

Pakistan

Bagh-e-Jinnah, Lahore
Hazuri Bagh, Lahore
Iqbal Park, Lahore (national public park)
Rani Bagh, Hyderabad
Shalimar Gardens, Lahore

Portugal
Estufa Fria
Garden of Santa Barbara
Penedo da Saudade

Republic of Ireland

Russia
Alexander Garden
Catherine Garden
Kuskovo Garden
Monplaisir Garden
Monrepos Park
Pavlovsk Park
Peterhof Garden
Strelna Garden
Summer Garden

South Africa
Jameson Park and Rose Garden

Spain
Generalife
Huerta de la Alcurnia
Jardín histórico
La Granjilla de La Fresneda de El Escorial
Sabatini Gardens

Sweden
Norrviken Gardens
Oskarshamns Stadspark
Umedalen skulpturpark
Vauxhall (Gothenburg)

Switzerland
Jardin Anglais
Parc des Eaux Vives
Parc La Grange
Rapperswil Rose Gardens

Turkey
Konya Tropical Butterfly Garden

Ukraine
Sofiyevka, Uman

United Kingdom

Gardens in Northern Ireland
Gardens in Scotland
List of gardens in England
List of gardens in Wales

United States

Arboretum Villanova, Villanova, Pennsylvania
Arnold Arboretum, Harvard University, Boston
Central Park, New York
Golden Gate Park, San Francisco
Hakone Gardens, Saratoga, California
Kraus Preserve of Ohio Wesleyan University, Delaware, Ohio
Lincoln Park, Chicago
National Tropical Botanical Garden, five garden locations
Sculpture in the Park, Ottawa Hills, Ohio

See also
 Index of gardening articles

 
Gardens